The Athletic News Cricket Annual was one of several sporting annuals published initially by the Athletic News, a Manchester-based newspaper devoted almost entirely to reporting sports events. It was first issued in 1888 and it had reached its 48th edition by 1939 (after omitting the First World War years). By that time it was generally including over 200 pages together with a small number of photographs. As well as containing test match and county championship records, this particular cricket annual differed from a number of similar publications by the depth of its coverage of certain minor leagues — especially those in the north of England (close to its home base) and also in Scotland.

After World War II it reappeared as the Athletic News Cricket and Golf Annual (1946), then subsequently – from its 50th year – as the Sunday Chronicle Cricket and Golf Annual (1947-1954), before one last year as the Sunday Chronicle Cricket Annual (1955). Like its companion volume the Athletic News Football Annual it was for many years edited by ‘Tityrus’ (J A H Catton) and afterwards by Ivan Sharpe.

Details

Editions produced since 1935:-

Note: The 1947-1955 editions were sub-titled 'incorporating the Athletic News Cricket Annual'.

References

Cricket books